Jamil Aziz oghlu Aliyev (30 March 1946) is a Doctor of Medicine, Professor, Academician of Azerbaijan National Academy of Sciences, Honored Scientist of the Azerbaijan Republic, Director of National Oncology Center of Ministry of Health of the Republic of Azerbaijan.

Biography
Jamil Aliyev was born on March 30, 1946 in Baku. He was graduated from Azerbaijan Medical Institute in 1968. 

In 1973, he defended his dissertation on "Diagnosis and treatment of cancer of the mucous membrane of the skin of the lower lip and oral cavity". In 1978 he defended his doctoral dissertation on "Plastic surgery for skin melanoma and cancer" at All-Union Oncology Scientific Center of the USSR Academy of Medical Sciences in Moscow and was awarded the degree of Doctor of Medicine. In 1980, Jamil Aliyev was awarded academician N. N. Petrov Prize of the USSR Academy of Medical Sciences for this monography. In 1987, he was awarded the title of Professor of Oncology by the decision of Supreme Attestation Commission of the USSR for effective activity in the field of training scientific personnel. 

Professor heads the oncology department of Azerbaijan State Institute for the Improvement of Physicians named after A. Aliyev since 1994. Since 1990, he has been Director General of National Oncology Center. C. A. Aliyev is the author of more than 600 scientific articles, 10 inventions, 18 monographs and textbooks for students.

In 2001, he was elected a full member of Azerbaijan National Academy of Sciences.

Memberships

Awards

References

See also
 Heydar Aliyev

1946 births
Living people
Azerbaijan Medical University alumni
Azerbaijani professors
Azerbaijani oncologists
Physicians from Baku
Soviet oncologists